Sturm Café is an electronic body music band from Gävle, Sweden.

Music made by Sturm Café provided the soundtrack of the movie Die Zombiejäger.

Band members
 Jonatan Löfstedt - vocals, music
 Gustav Jansson - music, live keyboards & drums

Occasional band members / collaborators
 Pehr-Anders Stockenberg - live drums (2007-2009)
 Oskar Gullstrand - videoprojections, art work, music videos (2002-2006)
 Björn Andersson - live keys (2003)
 Joakim Mohlund - guest vocals on "Schweiss Bier und Stahl", live keyboards and drums 
 Slim Vic - credited as remixer on "So Seelisch, So Schön!" 2CD version.
 Chinese Theatre - credited as remixer on "So Seelisch, So Schön!" 2CD version
 Patrik Linderstam - visuals, graphic design

History
Sturm Café was founded by the two teenage boys Gustav (born 1985) and Jonatan (born 1985) in 2001 under the name The Xenophobian Alliance. They released a couple of demo cassette tapes which were handed out to close friends. The instrumentation was a cheap digital synth with an Atari for sequencing and an analog 4 channel portable studio the quality of the songs were low but charming.

Later on in 2002 they bought some analogue synthesizers and a digital portable studio and the music started to spread through mp3.com. At this time, the name of the band had been changed to Sturm Café. The name was suggested by Gustav's father. The music had moved to a definite EBM:ish approach with minimalistic analogue basslines, monotonous drum machines and chanting vocals in German.

This eventually led to some live gigs in early 2003. Now people started to talk and the success was a fact when they performed live at Sweden's biggest open air alternative music festival, Arvika Festival, in the summer of 2004. Later that year, they signed a contract with the record label Progress Productions.

One year later, the album So Seelisch, So Schön! was released and climbed to position 75 on the Swedish official album sell chart. That autumn, Jonatan moved to Poland for medicine studies. Sturm Café was put on halt. However, Jonatan moved back to Sweden the next year and the work with the band could continue.

Instrumentation
 Sequential Circuits Pro-One
 Korg Poly-800
 Korg Poly 800 II
 ARP Odyssey MKII
 Korg ARP Odyssey
 Moog Prodigy
 MicroKORG
 Novation DrumStation
 Novation Bass Station
 Roland TR-505
 Yamaha RX11
 Atari Mega 4
 Akai S900
 Akai S3000
 Korg N1R
 DOD Graphic Equaliser R-815A
 EKS Cyclone Multistage Processor
 Korg D1600
 Yamaha AW16G
 Tama Techstar TS-306 Electronic Voice Module
 Yamaha Dx7s
 Yamaha Tx81z

Discography
 So Seelisch, So Schön! CD/2CD (2005)
 Tot CDM (2008)
 Koka Kola Freiheit 7" (2010)
 Rarities 2xCD (2013)
 Europa! CD & 2x12" (2015)
 Es Geht CD, 12" & MC (2017)
 Fernes Land CD, 12" & MC (2021)

Compilations
 APE Produkt #3 CDR (contributing track: "Regimegegner") (2003)
 Electronic Compilation CD-R (contributing track: "In Meinem Griff" + "Radiosüchtig") (2004)
 Interbreeding III: Xenophobic 2CD (contributing track: "In Meinem Griff" + "Mr.T") (2004)
 ElectriXmas 2004 CD (contributing track: "Ein Mann Und Sein Bart") (2004)
 Born / Evolve / Progress vol.1 CD (contributing track: "Stiefelfabrik" + "Schweiss Bier und Stahl") (2005)
 Hymns of Steel CD (contributing track: "Schweiss Bier und Stahl") (2006)
 Sonic Seducer Cold Hands Seduction Vol. 56  2CD (contributing track: "Die Wahrheit") (2006)
 Infacted vol.3 CD (contributing track: "Radiosüchtig") (2006)
 Born / Evolve / Progress vol.2 CD (contributing track: "Weltliches Leben") (2007)
 Mortal Decay 2CD-R (contributing track: "Der Grosse Schwein (Terror Punk Syndicate Remix)") (2007)
 Infected vol.4 2CD (contributing track: "Tot (Terror Punk Syndicate Remix)") (2008)
 Machines Against Hunger 2CD (contributing track: "1/15") (2008)
 Nacht Der Maschinen VolumeTwo CD (contributing track: "Ich Spekuliere") (2008)
 5 Years Of Progress - 2004-2009 CD (contributing track: "Der Löwe Ist Zurück") (2009)
 EBM Collection Vol.1 12" (contributing track: "Der Löwe Ist Zurück") (2009)
 Swedish EBM - The Collection CD (contributing track: "Scheissnormal") (2010)
 Nacht Der Maschinen Volume Three (contributing track: "Der Löwe Ist Zurück") (2011)
 Electronic Body Matrix 1 (contributing track: "Die Wahrheit") (2011)
 Doppelhertz Vol. 2'' (contributing track: "Sicherheit") (2011)

Complete tour history
 Klubb Volga, Sweden Stockholm, April 23, 2003
 Club Absynth, Sweden Gävle, May 30, 2003
 Kungen, Sweden Sandviken, July 18, 2003
 Valhall, Sweden Falun, July 20, 2003
 Musikhuset, Sweden Gävle, December 13, 2003
 Electrobash #2, Sweden Uppsala, January 23, 2004
 Adrenalinfestival, Sweden Sundsvall, January 31, 2004
 Club Spacelab, Sweden Gothenburg, February 6, 2004
 Club Absynth, Sweden Gävle, March 11, 2004
 Kungen, Sweden Sandviken, April 3, 2004
 More Than A Party '04, Sweden Uppsala, April 11, 2004
 Vogon Variety, Sweden Malmö, May 8, 2004
 Plasticity, Sweden Gothenburg, July 9, 2004
 Arvikafestival, Sweden Arvika, July 15, 2004
 Electronic Wonders, Sweden Oskarshamn, October 30, 2004
 Bodybeats, Germany Berlin, November 13, 2004
 Beatclub, Germany Dessau, November 20, 2004
 Club Harrow Road, Sweden Örebro, December 3, 2004
 ElectriXmas, Sweden Lund, December 11, 2004
 Allhuset, Sweden Stockholm, December 17, 2004
 Club Spacelab, Sweden Gothenburg, February 4, 2005
 Musikhuset, Sweden Gävle, March 18, 2005
 Sticky Fingers, Sweden Gothenburg, November 4, 2005
 Nuclear Nation, Sweden Linköping, November 5, 2005
 Neostalgia, Sweden Malmö, February 4, 2006
 Allhuset, Sweden Stockholm, February 11, 2006
 SAMA, Sweden Gothenburg, April 14, 2006
 Der Bunker, Sweden Gothenburg, July 28, 2006
 Beatclub, Germany Dessau, September 9, 2006
 Klubb Lakritz, Sweden Norrköping, November 24, 2006
 Das Boot, Baltic Sea December 8, 2006
 Sus Fel Nap, Hungary Budapest, January 19, 2007
 Tech Noir, Sweden Stockholm, January 27, 2007
 Musikhuset, Sweden Gävle, February 23, 2007
 Die Villa, Germany Leipzig, April 7, 2007
 Club Undercut, Sweden Lund, May 3, 2007
 Void Spring Festival, Sweden Kalmar, May 5, 2007
 Club Hellfire, Norway Trondheim, June 9, 2007
 Club Maiden, Norway Oslo, June 10, 2007
 Familientreffen III, Germany Sandersleben, August 4, 2007
 Club Radium, Sweden Karlstad, November 2, 2007
 Beatclub, Germany Dessau, March 23, 2008
 Club Arkham, Finland Turku, November 21, 2008
 Club Lagerhof, Germany Leipzig, December 6, 2008
 Musikens Hus, Sweden Gothenburg, May 16, 2009
 Familientreffen V, Germany Sandersleben, July 24, 2009
 Bodytåget, Sweden Stockholm, March 6, 2010
 Klubb Kalabalik, Sweden Växjö, March 20, 2010
 Traffic Club, Italy Rome, April 3, 2010
 Salzmanns Factory, Germany Kassel, July 10, 2010
 Collapsed City Festival, Poland Szczecin, October 31, 2010
 Belgian Independent Music Festival, Belgium Antwerp, December 18, 2010
 Holdeplassen, Norway Trondheim, March 19, 2011
 Beatclub, Germany Dessau, March 26, 2011
 Bodyfest, Sweden Stockholm, October 1, 2011
 Neostalgia, Sweden Malmö, March 24, 2012
 Kulttempel, Germany Oberhausen, September 7, 2012
 EBM Music Club, Germany Cologne, February 23, 2013
 Familientreffen IX, Germany Sandersleben, July 5, 2013
 Kafka Club, Belgium Antwerp, September 13, 2013
 Summer Stomp, Germany Kassel, September 14, 2013
 Club Sputnik, Sweden Jönköping, April 26, 2014
 Electronic Summer, Sweden Gothenburg, August 29, 2015
 EBM Music Club, Germany Cologne, September 19, 2015
 Bodyfest, Sweden Stockholm, October 23, 2015
 El Baile de Mascaras Episodio XIV, Mexico Mexico City, October 30, 2015
 El Real Under, Mexico Mexico City, October 31, 2015
 Beatclub, Germany Dessau, December 31, 2015
 El Calabozo, Peru Lima, August 6, 2016
 VII. E-Only Festival, Germany Leipzig, February 18, 2017
 Kalabalik På Tyrolen, Sweden Alvesta, August 26, 2017
 12. NCN Festival, Germany Deutzen, September 8, 2017
 Soho Stage, Germany Augsburg, September 9, 2017
 Stiefel Fest, Germany Oberhausen, November 3, 2017
 Blasphemous Beats, Germany Hamburg, November 4, 2017
 Progress 13, Sweden Gothenburg, November 18, 2017
 Wave Gotik Treffen, Germany Leipzig, May 20, 2018
 Sticky Fingers, Sweden Gothenburg, September 14, 2018
 Klubb Död, Sweden Stockholm, December 1, 2018
 Replugged, Austria Vienna, March 30, 2019
 Subkultfestivalen 2019, Sweden Trollhättan, June 15, 2019
 Celebrata Hindrheimr 2019, Norway Trondheim, July 6, 2019
 Nuclear Nation, Sweden Linköping, October 12, 2019
 EBM Night, Switzerland Zürich, November 9, 2019
 Bimfest XVII, Belgium Sint-Niklaas, December 14, 2019
 Vardagsrumfestival, Sweden Staffanstorp, February 1, 2020
 The Place, Russia Saint Petersburg, February 22, 2020
 Alibi, Russia Moscow, February 23, 2020
 Klubb Berlin, Sweden Umeå, March 12, 2022
 Barbros Brygga Sweden Karlstad, March 25, 2022
 Musikens Hus, Sweden Göteborg, March 26, 2022
 Musikhuset, Sweden Gävle, April 23, 2022
 WGT EBM Warm Up Day 1, Germany Leipzig, July 9, 2022
 WGT EBM Warm Up Day 2, Germany Leipzig, July 10, 2022
 Subkultfestivalen 2022, Sweden Vänersborg, July 9, 2022
 Amphi Festival, Germany Cologne, July 24, 2022
 Lygten Station, Denmark Copenhagen, September 9, 2022
 Charles Dickens, Sweden Helsingborg, September 10, 2022
 Schattenwelt Festival 2022, Austria Vienna, October 8, 2022
 Klubb Död, Sweden Stockholm, November 19, 2022
 Kulttempel, Germany Oberhausen, January 20, 2023

External links
 
Homepage

Interviews
 Synth.nu Interview 2005
 Synth.nu Interview 2021
 Side-Line Interview 2021

Reviews
 So Seelisch, So Schön! CD Review in Neurozine
 So Seelisch, So Schön! CD Review in Metica
 So Seelisch, So Schön! CD Review in Sideline
 Concert Review, April 2006
 Concert Review, April 2004
 Fernes Land album review in I Die: You Die, February 2021

Electronic body music groups
Swedish industrial music groups
Musical groups established in 2001